Qasrik-e Sofla (also Romanized as Qaşrīk-e Soflá; also known as Qaşrīk) is a village in Shenetal Rural District, Kuhsar District, Salmas County, West Azerbaijan Province, Iran. At the 2006 census, its population was 228, in 54 families.

References 

Populated places in Salmas County